Karari Chandpur is a census town in the Kaliachak I CD block in the Malda Sadar subdivision of Malda district in the state of West Bengal, India.

Geography

Location
 	
According to the map of Kaliachak CD block in the District Census Handbook, Maldah, 2011, Silampur, Baliadanga, Alipur and Karari Chandpur form a cluster of census towns.

Area overview
The area shown in the adjoining map is the physiographic sub-region known as the diara. It "is a relatively well drained flat land formed by the fluvial deposition of newer alluvium." The most note-worthy feature is the Farakka Barrage across the Ganges. The area is a part of the Malda Sadar subdivision, which is an overwhelmingly rural region, but the area shown in the map has pockets of urbanization with 17 census towns, concentrated mostly in the Kaliachak I CD block. The bank of the Ganges between Bhutni and Panchanandapur (both the places are marked on the map), is the area worst hit  by left bank erosion, a major problem in the Malda area. The ruins of Gauda, capital of several empires, is located in this area.

Note: The map alongside presents some of the notable locations in the area. All places marked in the map are linked in the larger full screen map.

Demographics
According to the 2011 Census of India, Karari Chandpur had a total population of 10,941, of which 5,571 (51%) were males and 5,370 (49%) were females. Population in the age range 0–6 years was 1,777. The total number of literate persons in Karari Chandpur  was 4,798 (52.36% of the population over 6 years).

Infrastructure
According to the District Census Handbook, Maldah, 2011, Karari Chandpur covered an area of 2.4041 km2. The protected water-supply involved tap water from treated sources, tube well/ bore well. It had 856 domestic electric connections. Among the educational facilities, it had 1 primary school in town, other school facilities at Kaliachak 3 km away. It had 5 non-formal education centres (Sarva Shiksha Abhiyan). It produced cocoon.

References

Cities and towns in Malda district